The 1903 Cornell Big Red football team was an American football team that represented Cornell University during the 1903 college football season.  In their first season under head coach Bill Warner, the Big Red compiled a 6–3–1 record and outscored all opponents by a combined total of 120 to 103.  While the team shut out 7 of 10 opponents, it gave up 44 and 42 points in losses to Princeton and Penn, respectively.

Schedule

References

Cornell
Cornell Big Red football seasons
Cornell Big Red football